Duetto may refer to:

Music

Compositions
Duetto, fugue for violin and oboe Edward Elgar
Duetto, for chamber ensemble by Rossini
 No. 6 Andante con moto in A-flat major from Op. 38 Songs Without Words book 3 by Felix Mendelssohn
 Duetto per Violoncello e Contrabasso, by Gioachino Rossini (1824)
Duetto, for strings by William Blezard (1921-2003) 
Duetto, several compositions by Wilhelm Friedemann Bach

Band
Duetto (duo), formed 2017

Albums
Duetto, a 2003 recital album by Marcelo Álvarez and Salvatore Licitra
Duetto,  album by Mina Mazzini and Lucio Battisti

Other
Duetto, Alfa Romeo Spider
Duetto (manga)